Guy Pelham Benson (born March 7, 1985) is an American columnist, commentator, and political pundit. He is a contributor to Fox News, political editor of Townhall.com, and a conservative talk radio host. Benson served as a Fellow at the Georgetown Institute of Politics and Public Service during the spring 2021 academic semester.

Education
Born in Saudi Arabia, Benson lived much of his early life overseas, then grew up in Ridgewood, New Jersey, where he attended middle school and Ridgewood High School. During high school, he was known for broadcasting sports on local television. While working toward his bachelor's degree at Northwestern University, Benson worked for the campus radio station, WNUR, broadcasting sporting events and hosting a political talk show. He also interned for two summers at Fox News, working primarily with Hannity & Colmes, before assisting the channel with its coverage of the 2004 Republican National Convention. Benson also reported for an NPR station in South Florida, broadcast summer baseball games in the Cape Cod Baseball League, and interned at the White House.

Career
After graduating with honors from the Medill School of Journalism at Northwestern University in 2007, Benson served as the producer of The Sandy Rios Show, then a local afternoon radio show with Christian Right commentator Sandy Rios on WYLL-AM in Chicago, before Rios moved to Washington D.C. in July 2010 to host Sandy Rios in the Morning on AFR TALK on American Family Radio. From to 2008 to 2015, Benson also hosted his own Sunday night radio program, The Guy Benson Show, on AM 560 WIND in Chicago and AM 1260 WWRC in Washington, D.C.

In 2010, Benson became political editor at Townhall.com, where his columns had been published since February 2008.
Benson also contributes to Townhall's sister site, Hot Air. He previously wrote at Andrew Breitbart's "Big" sites and National Review Online's Media Blog. In addition to serving as a regular guest and substitute host on The Hugh Hewitt Show, Benson is a frequent guest on cable news networks, including Fox News and CNBC. In May 2015, together with coauthor Mary Katharine Ham, Benson published his first non-fiction book End of Discussion: How the Left's Outrage Industry Shuts Down Debate, Manipulates Voters, and Makes America Less Free (and Fun), a critique of political correctness in politics, media and culture from the point of view of two Millennial conservatives.

In April 2008 Benson discovered video from a 2007 reunion of the Weathermen, a radical left-wing group from the 1960s and 70s. The footage included quotes from two members, Bill Ayers and Bernardine Dohrn, defending their actions. Since Barack Obama was criticized during the 2008 presidential campaign for associating with Ayers and Dohrn, the clips made national news, from the Boston Globe to Fox News. Benson garnered national attention during the 2008 presidential race on two other occasions. In August, after the Obama campaign attacked WGN radio in Chicago for allowing Stanley Kurtz to appear on their station, Benson—who was in studio during the interview—detailed his experience. Then, two weeks before Election Day, Benson joined with Mary Katharine Ham and Ed Morrissey to pen "The Comprehensive Argument Against Barack Obama," released on Hot Air.

Personal life
Benson's brother is actor, writer, and director James Benson.  Guy Benson came out as gay in May 2015 by announcing in advance of publication that his new book, End of Discussion, would include a footnote: "Guy here. So, I'm gay." Benson told an interviewer that "gay rights is not something that dominates my attentions—or my passions."

In September 2019, Benson married Adam Wise.

References

External links
"The Guy Benson Show" Site
Guy Benson's Columns
Guy Benson, "Farewell (Sort of)", National Review, August 29, 2010

Living people
1985 births
Medill School of Journalism alumni
New Jersey Republicans
Washington, D.C., Republicans
People from Ridgewood, New Jersey
Ridgewood High School (New Jersey) alumni
American talk radio hosts
American LGBT broadcasters
LGBT people from Washington, D.C.
American LGBT journalists
American gay writers
LGBT people from New Jersey
American columnists
American political commentators
21st-century American journalists
Journalists from New Jersey
LGBT conservatism in the United States
21st-century American male writers
American male journalists
Fox News people